This is a list of flag bearers who have represented Jamaica at the Olympics.

Flag bearers carry the national flag of their country at the opening ceremony of the Olympic Games.

See also
Jamaica at the Olympics

References

Jamaica at the Olympics
Jamaica
Olympic Flag bearers